The R-Darter is a beyond visual range (BVR) air-to-air missile guided by an active radar homing seeker. It was designed and manufactured by the South African firm Kentron, now known as Denel Dynamics.

The South African air-to-air missile program benefited from cooperation with Israel  during the 1980s and the R-Darter is very similar to the Python Derby.

Service
The missile armed the South African Air Force's Cheetah C fighter aircraft and was withdrawn from service when those were retired in 2008. The SAAF has not yet publicly announced which BVR missile will be procured to equip the 26 Saab JAS 39 Gripens which have replaced the Cheetahs.

The Brazilian Air Force is said to be evaluating the R-Darter for use with their F-5 fighters since Denel will be selling the missiles used for the test at a low price, as they are nearing the end of their shelf-life.

It was reported in 2010 that the R-Darter is being operated by the Pakistan Air Force.

See also
AIM-120 AMRAAM, a similar type of missile (beyond visual range)
A-Darter, Denel's short range infrared homing missile.

References

Post–Cold War weapons of South Africa
Cold War military equipment of South Africa
Air-to-air missiles of South Africa
Denel
Israel–South Africa relations
Military equipment introduced in the 1990s